Scott Paul Donnelly (born 25 December 1987) is an English footballer who plays as a midfielder for Hayes & Yeading United.

Career
Born in Hammersmith, Greater London, Donnelly had a promising start to his career, making his first league appearance for Queens Park Rangers at the age of 16 in October 2004 during a 2–1 defeat to Preston North End. A series of injuries set him back though and, despite signing a professional contract in 2006, he was released in January 2007.

Donnelly then played for non-League side Wealdstone and scored on his debut. In July 2007, had a successful trial and joined Aldershot Town. He was later handed a contract to keep him at the club until the end of the 2008–09 season, and scored the equaliser in a 1–1 draw with Exeter City that handed them promotion to the Football League. Donnelly also scored the Aldershot winner with a free kick in the team's first league game this season against Accrington Stanley, making him the first player to score for Aldershot in their second spell as a Football League club.

On 1 February 2010, it was reported that Donnelly was set to join Wycombe Wanderers on loan with a view to a permanent move.

On 23 June 2010, Donnelly agreed a move to Swansea City, penning a three-year deal with the EFL Championship outfit.

He made one appearance as an 81st-minute substitute during a 3–0 victory over Crystal Palace.

On 30 December 2010, Donnelly agreed a loan move to Wycombe Wanderers, the club he was linked with during the summer. His loan spell lasts until the end of the 2010–11 season. On 13 June 2011, it was announced that Donnelly would return on loan to Wycombe until the end of the 2011–12 season. He went on trial with Bradford City, featuring in their tour of Ireland 4–0 win against Wexford Youths.
In September 2012, Donnelly joined Aldershot on a short-term contract. He made his debut on 29 September against York City. This was quickly followed by a short time on loan at Southend United in order to try an earn a permanent transfer. However this was unsuccessful and he then joined Farnborough of the Conference South in order to benefit from first team football and improve his fitness.

In January 2013 Donnelly signed for Newport County until the end of the 2012–13 season. Donnelly scored on his Newport debut after 30 seconds versus Tamworth on 9 February 2013. County eventually finished 3rd in the league, reaching the Conference National playoffs. Newport County won the playoff final versus Wrexham at Wembley Stadium 2–0 to return to the Football League after a 25-year absence with promotion to Football League Two. He was released by Newport County 10 May 2013.

In August 2013 Donnelly rejoined Farnborough on a non-contract basis.

In October 2017 he joined his current club Hayes & Yeading United, scoring 2 goals on his debut against Cambridge City. He left the club in the summer 2019 to join Moneyfields. However, he returned to Hayes & Yeading United again on 20 August 2019. In December 2021, he re-signed for Southern Football League Premier Division South side Hayes & Yeading United for a third time, having left divisional rivals Beaconsfield Town, for whom he had only signed for in the summer.

Career statistics

A.  The "Other" column constitutes appearances and goals (including substitutes) in the EFL Trophy and Conference League Cup.

Family

His sister Stacey Tracey Donnelly plays for the U17 Republic of Ireland women's national football team that reached the 2010 UEFA U-17 Women's Championship Final .

Honours
Aldershot Town
Conference League Cup: 2008
Newport County
Conference National play-off winner: 2013

References

External links

Scott Donnelly at Aylesbury United

1987 births
Footballers from Hammersmith
Living people
Association football midfielders
English footballers
Queens Park Rangers F.C. players
Wealdstone F.C. players
Aldershot Town F.C. players
Swansea City A.F.C. players
Wycombe Wanderers F.C. players
Southend United F.C. players
Newport County A.F.C. players
Farnborough F.C. players
Havant & Waterlooville F.C. players
Moneyfields F.C. players
Chippenham Town F.C. players
Hayes & Yeading United F.C. players
Beaconsfield Town F.C. players
English Football League players
National League (English football) players
Southern Football League players
Isthmian League players